Erica Sabiti was Archbishop of Uganda, Rwanda, Burundi and Boga-Zaire from 1966 to 1974.

Kagwisagye Sabiti was born in 1907 in Nkore (later known as Ankole) in today's South-Western Uganda. He was educated at King's College Budo and Makerere College. He was ordained deacon in 1933 and priest in 1934. After 26 years of serving the church in Uganda, he was consecrated Bishop of Rwenzori and Dean in 1960.

References

20th-century Anglican bishops in Africa
20th-century Anglican archbishops
Anglican archbishops of Uganda
Uganda Christian University alumni
Anglican bishops of Rwenzori
Anglican deans in Africa
People educated at King's College Budo
Ankole people